The women's canoe sprint K-1 200 metres at the 2016 Olympic Games in Rio de Janeiro took place between 15 and 16 August at Lagoa Stadium. The medals were presented by Barbara Kendall, IOC member, New Zealand and Maree Burnett, Board Member of the ICF.

Competition format

The competition comprised heats, semifinals, and a final round.  The top six boats from each heat progressed to semifinals. The top two boats in each semifinal and the next two best boats overall advanced to the "A" final, and competed for medals. A placing "B" final was held for the next eight best boats.

Schedule

All times are Brasilia Time (UTC-03:00)

Results

Heats
Top six boats progress to semifinals.

Heat 1

Heat 2

Heat 3

Heat 4

Semifinals
The fastest two canoeists in each semifinal, and the overall next two best boats qualify for the 'A' final. The next eight best boats overall qualify for the 'B' final.

Semifinal 1

Semifinal 2

Semifinal 3

Finals

Final B

Final A

References

Canoeing at the 2016 Summer Olympics
Women's events at the 2016 Summer Olympics